Win or WIN may refer to: 

 A victory

Arts and entertainment

Film
 Win!, a 2016 American film

Literature
 Win (Coben novel), a 2121 novel by Harlan Coben
 WIN (pacifist magazine), published by the War Resisters League
 WIN (wrestling magazine), American high school and college amateur wrestling publication

Music
 Win (band), a Scottish band
 "Win" (song), by Jay Rock
 "Win", a song by Brian McKnight from the album Gold
 "Win", a song by David Bowie from the album Young Americans
 "Win", a song by Stefflon Don and DJ Khaled from the mixtape Secure
 Worldwide Independent Network (WIN), a coalition of independent music bodies, see Independent record label#Worldwide Independent Network (WIN))

Television and radio
 DWNU or Win Radio, a Filipino radio station
 Win FM, an Indian radio station
 WIN Television, an Australian television network
 WIN Corporation, the owner of WIN Television
 WIN News, the news service for WIN Television
 WIN (TV station), the flagship station of WIN Television

People

People with the surname Win 
 Aye Aye Win (born 1953), Burmese journalist
 Everjoice Win (born 1965), Zimbabwean feminist activist
 Ne Win (1910–2002), Burmese military commander
 Soe Win (disambiguation), multiple people
 Nyan Win (born 1953), foreign minister of Myanmar since 2004
 Win Zaw (born 1982) Burmese politician currently serving as a House of Nationalities MP

People with the given name or nickname Win
 Win Butler (born 1980), American-Canadian musician
 Win Elliot (1915–1998), American sportscaster and game show host
 Win Gatchalian (born 1974), Filipino politician
 Win Headley (born 1949), American football player
 Win Lyovarin (born 1956), Thai writer
 Win Rockefeller (1948–2006), American politician, farmer, and businessman
 Win Rosenfeld (born 1978), American screenwriter and producer
 Win (born 1999), stage name of Thai actor Metawin Opas-iamkajorn

Science and technology
 Microsoft Windows, a group of several graphical operating systems
 Win4Lin, a Windows-related software application
 Wireless Intelligent Network, a concept in development to transport the resources of an intelligent network to a wireless network

Sport
 Win (baseball), a statistical credit given to a pitcher
 Win (horse), a racehorse

Transportation
 The International Air Transport Association airport code for Winton Airport in Queensland, Australia
 Winchester railway station (three-letter station code) in England
 Winona (Amtrak station)  (three-letter Amtrak station code), a train station in Winona, Minnesota

Other uses
 Win, a type of bet offered by UK bookmakers
 WIN, chemical compounds (like WIN 55,212-2) first produced by Sterling Drug
 WIN Party, a small New Zealand political party
WIN/GIA, the Worldwide Independent Network/Gallup International Association, of market research firms, 2010-2017
 White-Indian-Negro, an old usage for Métis, tri-racial isolates
 "Whip inflation now", an attempt to start a movement to combat inflation during the mid-1970s
 Wolność i Niezawisłość ("Freedom and Independence"), an underground Polish anti-communist organization in 1945–1952
 Wound-induced protein, a type of plant protein that is related to Pro-hevein

See also
 WINS (disambiguation)
 Winn (disambiguation)
 Winner (disambiguation)
 Winning (disambiguation)
 Wyn, a surname
 Wynn (disambiguation)

Burmese-language surnames
English unisex given names
Surnames of Burmese origin